Helen Holmes may refer to:

 Helen Freudenberger Holmes, American journalist, teacher, politician, historian, and Army veteran
 Helen Holmes (actress) (1892–1950)